Miss Universe 1973, the 22nd Miss Universe pageant, was held on 21 July 1973 at the Odeon of Herodes Atticus in Athens, Greece. Margarita Moran of the Philippines was crowned by Kerry Anne Wells of Australia at the end of the event, thus making her the second Filipino to win the title after Gloria Diaz.

There were 61 delegates from around the world who competed for the 1973 title. This was the first Miss Universe event to be held in Europe, as well as in the Eastern Hemisphere.

Results

Placements

Contestants

Notes

Withdrawals
  - Cyprianna Munnings
  - Katrin Gisladóttir
  - Mary Nunez Bartra

Awards
  - Miss Amity (Jeanette Robertson)
  - Miss Photogenic (Margarita Moran)
  - Best National Costume (María Martín)

General References

References
Specific

General

1973
1973 in Greece
1973 beauty pageants
Beauty pageants in Greece
Events in Athens
July 1973 events in Europe